Mahitab Kadın (1830 -  1888; meaning "moonlight"), called also Mehtab Kadın, was a consort of Sultan Abdulmejid I of the Ottoman Empire.

Life
Mahitab married Abdulmejid in 1845. She was given the title of "Second Ikbal". Three years later, on 15 April 1848, she gave birth to her first child, a daughter, Sabiha Sultan in the Old Çırağan Palace. The princess died a year later on 27 April 1849. 

In 1850, she was elevated to the title of "Senior Ikbal". Two years later on 31 March 1852, she gave birth to her second child, a son, Şehzade Nureddin in the Old Çırağan Palace.

In early 1853, she was elevated to the title of "Fifth Kadın", an honorary rank because she was one of favorite Abdülmejid's consort. In 1858–59, she sponsored a mosque in Göynük.

After Abdulmejid's death on 25 June 1861, Mahitab settled in the Feriye Palace with her eleven years old son, Şehzade Nureddin. Her son, Nureddin died in 1884 at the age of thirty two. She died in 1888 in the Feriye Palace, and was buried in the mausoleum of the imperial ladies in the New Mosque, Istanbul.

Issue

In literature
Mahitab is a character in Hıfzı Topuz's historical novel Abdülmecit: İmparatorluk Çökerken Sarayda 22 Yıl: Roman (2009).

See also
Kadın (title)
List of consorts of the Ottoman sultans
Ottoman Imperial Harem

References

Sources

1888 deaths
Consorts of Abdulmejid I